Javon Freeman-Liberty (born October 20, 1999) is an American professional basketball player for the Windy City Bulls of the NBA G League. He played college basketball for the DePaul Blue Demons of the Big East Conference. He also previously played for the Valparaiso Crusaders.

High school career
Freeman-Liberty began playing high school basketball for Seton Academy in South Holland, Illinois. After the school closed, he transferred to Whitney M. Young Magnet High School in Chicago, Illinois. As a junior, Freeman-Liberty averaged 13.6 points, 5.2 rebounds and 2.1 assists per game, helping his team win the Class 4A state title. In his senior season, he averaged about 20 points and six rebounds per game, leading Whitney Young back to the state title game. He committed to playing college basketball for Valparaiso over offers from VCU and Saint Louis, among others.

College career
As a freshman at Valparaiso, Freeman-Liberty averaged 11 points and 4.3 rebounds per game, earning Missouri Valley Conference (MVC) All-Defensive and All-Freshman honors. On November 25, 2019, he posted a sophomore season-high 32 points, nine rebounds, four assists and four steals in an 81–77 overtime loss to Cincinnati. As a sophomore, Freeman-Liberty averaged 19 points, 6.1 rebounds, 3.2 assists and 2.2 steals per game, setting a program single-season record with 74 steals. He was selected to the First Team All-MVC, All-Defensive Team and Most-Improved Team. 

Freeman-Liberty declared for the 2020 NBA draft before withdrawing and transferring to DePaul.  He was granted immediate eligibility. In his junior season, he averaged 14.4 points, 5.3 rebounds and 2.6 assists per game. On November 20, 2021, Freeman-Liberty recorded a career-high 33 points and 11 rebounds in an 84–80 win over Western Illinois. On January 13, 2022, he aggravated a groin injury in a 96–92 victory over Seton Hall, forcing him to miss several games. Freeman-Liberty was named to the Second Team All-Big East.

Professional career

Windy City Bulls (2022–present)
On October 23, 2022, Freeman-Liberty joined the Windy City Bulls training camp roster.

Career statistics

College

|-
| style="text-align:left;"| 2018–19
| style="text-align:left;"| Valparaiso
| 33 || 33 || 31.3 || .452 || .289 || .693 || 4.3 || 2.0 || 1.8 || .4 || 11.0
|-
| style="text-align:left;"| 2019–20
| style="text-align:left;"| Valparaiso
| 33 || 33 || 33.2 || .436 || .287 || .750 || 6.1 || 3.2 || 2.2 || .3 || 19.0
|-
| style="text-align:left;"| 2020–21
| style="text-align:left;"| DePaul
| 14 || 14 || 31.9 || .427 || .293 || .740 || 5.3 || 2.6 || 1.5 || .1 || 14.4

|-
| style="text-align:left;"| 2021–22
| style="text-align:left;"| DePaul
| 24 || 24 || 34.9 || .430 || .368 || .739 || 7.3 || 3.2 || 1.7 || .1 || 21.7
|- class="sortbottom"
| style="text-align:center;" colspan="2"| Career
| 104 || 104 || 32.8 || .437 || .312 || .733 || 5.7 || 2.7 || 1.9 || .2 || 16.5

Personal life
Freeman-Liberty's uncle, Marcus Liberty, played four seasons in the NBA following a college career at Illinois.

References

External links
DePaul Blue Demons bio
Valparaiso Beacons bio

1999 births
Living people
American men's basketball players
Basketball players from Chicago
DePaul Blue Demons men's basketball players
Shooting guards
Valparaiso Beacons men's basketball players
Whitney M. Young Magnet High School alumni